The 1947 Texas Tech Red Raiders football team was an American football team that represented Texas Technological College (later known as Texas Tech University) as a member of the Border Conference during the 1947 college football season. In its seventh season under head coach Dell Morgan, the team compiled a 6–5 record (4–0 against conference opponents), lost to Miami (OH) in the 1948 Sun Bowl, and outscored all opponents by a total of 228 to 184.

The team played its first four home games at Tech Stadium in Lubbock, Texas.  The final home game of the season was played on November 29, 1947, at the new Clifford B. and Audrey Jones Stadium. The new concrete and steel stadium was built at a cost of $400,000 and was named in honor of the college's president emeritus and his wife.

Schedule

References

Texas Tech
Texas Tech Red Raiders football seasons
Border Conference football champion seasons
Texas Tech Red Raiders football